Rudolph E. Schild (born 10 January 1940) is an astrophysicist at the Harvard-Smithsonian Center for Astrophysics, who has been active since the mid-1960s. He has authored or contributed to over 250 papers, of which 150 are in refereed journals. He is married to mezzo-soprano Jane Struss, who teaches voice at Longy School of Music.

Schild is a proponent of "magnetospheric eternally collapsing objects" (MECOs), an alternative to black holes. These results are most often published in Journal of Cosmology, an astronomy journal edited by Schild himself, while his other research is published in mainstream astronomy journals such as MNRAS and the Astronomical Journal. He is a guest and speaker on Caroline Cory’s film Gods Among Us, where he gives his scientific perspective on the subject of extraterrestrial beings and telepathy.

References

Living people
Harvard University faculty
American astrophysicists
Panspermia
1940 births